Brwa Hekmat Nouri (born 23 January 1987) is an Iranian born Kurdish professional footballer who plays for Indonesian club Bali United as a midfielder. In 2016, he made his debut for the Iraq national team.

Club career
Nouri was born in Urmia,Iran to Kurdish parents and moved with his family to Sweden as a child. He started his football career at Vasalunds IF before joining AIK at the age of 13. He won the JSM final with AIK and where he scored in the final against Västra Frölunda.

He made his A-team debut in AIK on 7 October 2005, against Falkenbergs FF in the Superettan. In 2006 he was with AIK's A-team but was loaned to Åtvidabergs FF. He returned to AIK after the season but then he was loaned out again, this time to Väsby United in 2007. In total, Nouri played three league matches in the Superettan, a match in the Svenska cupen and 16 training matches for AIK.

Prior to the 2009 season, Nouri signed for Dalkurd FF. In November 2011, he extended his contract with the club for two years.

Östersunds FK
In 2014, Brwa Nouri signed for Östersunds FK, a team playing in the Superettan, the 2nd tier of Swedish football. He played his first game in the league against Ljungskile SK on 6 April 2014. Nouri quickly established himself as a vital part of the squad, and was the vice-captain of the club. He OFK finished the season in 5th place. In the next season, OFK finished second in the league table, and were promoted to the Allsvenskan. In their first season in the Allsvenskan, Brwa Nouri captained the team to an 8th-place finish and a historic Svenska Cupen victory, which saw them qualify to the Europa League qualifiers the following season.

ÖFK improved on their result the following season, finishing 5th in the Swedish league. ÖFK made headlines all around the world as they qualified to the group stages after defeating giants Galatasaray, where Brwa Nouri scored, Fola Esch, and PAOK, where Brwa Nouri scored. ÖFK were drawn in group J alongside Athletic Bilbao, Hertha BSC, and Zorya Luhansk. OFK finished second in the group, level on points with Bilbao. Brwa became the first Iraqi to score in the Europa League when he scored the winner against Hertha Berlin. ÖFK were knocked out by Arsenal in the round of 32.

International career
Nouri was born in Sulaymaniyah, Iraq, to an Iraqi-Kurdish family. He was raised in Sweden and played for their youth national teams, but switched to the Iraq national team for World Cup Qualifiers in October 2016. Nouri made his formal debut for Iraq in a 0–0 friendly tie with Jordan. He played in Iraq for the first time ever on 5 October 2017, where he scored his first goal for Iraq.

Career statistics

Club

International
Scores and results list Iraq's goal tally first, score column indicates score after each Nouri goal.

Honours
Östersunds FK
 Svenska Cupen: 2016–17

Bali United
 Liga 1: 2019, 2021–22

Individual
 Liga 1 Team of the Season: 2021–22

See also
 List of Iraq international footballers

References

External links

1987 births
People from Sulaymaniyah
Living people
Association football midfielders
Gröndals IK players
AIK Fotboll players
Dalkurd FF players
Östersunds FK players
Iraqi footballers
Iraq international footballers
Swedish footballers
Sweden youth international footballers
Swedish expatriate footballers
Iraqi expatriate footballers
Swedish people of Iraqi descent
Swedish people of Kurdish descent
Kurdish sportspeople
Allsvenskan players
Superettan players
Ettan Fotboll players
Division 2 (Swedish football) players
Bali United F.C. players
Zakho FC players
Liga 1 (Indonesia) players

Iraqi Premier League players
Iraqi expatriate sportspeople in Sweden
Expatriate footballers in Sweden 
Expatriate sportspeople in Indonesia
Expatriate footballers in Indonesia